The Island Def Jam Music Group (IDJMG) was an American recording music unit, formed on New Year's Eve 1998 by the Universal Music Group. It consists of labels devised and consisted under the basic operations of Island Records and Def Jam Recordings. On April Fools Day 2014, Universal Music publicly announced the disbandment of the Island Def Jam Music Group, leaving Island, Def Jam and its affiliated subsidiaries as separate sister labels.

History

1999: Seagram buyout of PolyGram and unit formation 
On December 10, 1998, The Seagram Company completed its seven-month $10.6 billion dollar plan to acquire PolyGram, merging its music label unit with the MCA Music unit of labels, consolidating both into what is known today as the Universal Music Group.

Following the formation of the Universal Music Group, and right on time for New Year's Day 1999, came the creation of the Island Def Jam Music Group, a new music label unit founded through the combination of fourteen or more recording labels, including those consisting of Island Records, Def Jam Recordings and Mercury Records. Although Island Def Jam grouped all three labels together, they continued to operate as separately autonomous labels under the unit, which was assumed presidency by Lyor Cohen.

In the United Kingdom, Island handled its own operations under Universal's Island Records Group, while Def Jam UK was created and distributed by Mercury, which also distributed its artists in that region under the banner with U.S. distribution rescinded by IDJMG.

1999-2001: Success 
The first official release through IDJMG was Biohazard's Mercury outing, New World Disorder, which was released on June 8, 1999. By that time, the Rush Associated Labels portfolio (which had been a holding ground for Def Jam) was absorbed into Island Def Jam, with most of its labels joining forces including Def Soul, Roc-A-Fella and Murder Inc. Records, all of which had been a part of the Def Jam Label Group since its PolyGram era between 1996-98. For Island, some of its divisions had been either sold off or folded into IDJMG; both of which being 4th & B'way Records and Island Black Music, with many of its artist rosters being transferred into Def Jam.

In 2000, the unit launched Def Jam Germany, the first international Def Jam label. The following year, a country label, Lost Highway Records, was formed. The label operated as an imprint of Mercury Records, but had since been moved to Universal Music's Nashville division following the dissolvement of IDJMG in 2014. In the summer of 2001, Island Def Jam acquired a controlling interest in the rock label, Roadrunner Records. Edel SE & Co. KGaA, a German music distributor which owned 17% of Roadrunner at the time, threatened to take legal action against Universal.

During the launch of the new third millennium, Island Def Jam raked in successful radio hits and Platinum-selling albums from its united artists like LL Cool J, Method Man, Redman, DMX, N.O.R.E. (Def Jam), Melissa Etheridge, Bon Jovi, Lionel Richie (Island), and other related associates.

2002-2009: Restructure, Murder Inc. problems, Roc-A-Fella buyout and new leadership 
In early 2002, the label won a bidding war to buy Mariah Carey's failed label contract with future UMG sister label Virgin Records. That November, she released Charmbracelet, but the album didn't perform successfully, sending Carey on a downward spiral as she was struggling with her mental problems at the time, putting her relationship with Island Def Jam at stake.

In 2003, Fefe Dobson, Everlast, and Patti LaBelle all became part of the unit. On January 3, the label unit was forced to cut all ties with producer Irv Gotti and his label, Murder Inc. Records, after a federal investigation and office raid considering allegations of money laundering in connection to an illegal operation maintained by a drug lord. That May, Island Def Jam were also ceased and desisted by Steve Gottlieb, founder of TVT Records, regarding the release of a Cash Money Click reunion album, which IDJMG restricted because of member Ja Rule's obligations with Def Jam. President Lyor Cohen obliged Gotti and Ja Rule not to record the album for TVT, but instead have IDJMG and UMG to distribute it to avoid conflict of interest. TVT's lawsuit cites copyright infringement, fraud and tortious interference. Ultimately, TVT was awarded $132 million in damages with Cohen ordered to pay $56 million of which he was found liable. It was later reversed two years later as TVT's cash award was reduced to $126,000 after Island Def Jam successfully appealed the judgment with a claim of this situation not being fraud nor infringement, but instead, breach of contract. At the end of the year, Dobson's self-titled debut was released on December 9, as was on the same date as Def Soul artists 112's Hot & Wet and Musiq Soulchild's Soulstar. Then, in May 2004, Everlast and LaBelle released their albums, White Trash Beautiful and Timeless Journey, under Island and Def Soul Classics respectively. At the same time, L.A. Reid was appointed president and CEO of the Island Def Jam Music Group after he was dismissed from Arista Records. Cohen left Island Def Jam to join Warner Music Group, bringing with him, his colleagues, Kevin Liles and Julie Greenwald.

In December, the unit acquired the remaining 50% interest in Roc-A-Fella Records in exchange for appointing co-founder Jay-Z president of Def Jam Recordings; the other 50% had been purchased by former Def Jam parent company, PolyGram, in 1997. As a result, fellow Roc-A-Fella cohorts Damon Dash and Kareem "Biggs" Burke were corporately forced off the label. Then, in early 2005, the group extended a new label deal renewal with Ludacris' Disturbing tha Peace, making IDJMG a stakeholder in another 50% interest in the imprint. In April, with L.A. Reid's leadership, Mariah Carey returned from a two-year hiatus with The Emancipation of Mimi. Upon an April release, the album sold 404,000 copies in its first week and opened to widespread acclaim from critics; a staggering improvement over her predecessor, Charmbracelet. That same year, Island Def Jam reached a breaking point when they signed a newcomer, a Barbadian songstress namely Rihanna. Her debut single, "Pon de Replay", was an instant hit.

In 2006, IDJMG ended their partnership with Roadrunner Records, selling the label to Warner Music.  Shakir Stewart was appointed senior vice president of A&R in October. A year later, Steve Bartels was appointed chairman and COO of Island Def Jam, reporting to L.A. Reid and then-CEO of Universal Music, Doug Morris. On December 22, 2007, Jay-Z announced his vacancy from his presidency of Def Jam, invoking L.A. Reid to step in rather than find a replacement. On November 1, 2008, Shakir Stewart committed suicide, vacating his positions as senior vice president of A&R at Island Def Jam and executive vice president of Def Jam. He was posthumously replaced by Christopher Hicks, a former executive from Warner Music Group.

Approaching 2009, IDJMG began to soar to new heights with Canadian pop sensation Justin Bieber. His single, "One Time", generated commercial success and iterated new generosity for the unit.

2010-11: Motown induction and GOOD Music partnership 
Throughout 2010, Island Def Jam had generated more success from Bieber ("Baby"), Kanye West (My Beautiful Dark Twisted Fantasy) and Rihanna ("Only Girl (In the World)").

In 2011, former RCA/Jive Label Group chairman Barry Weiss was assigned to become the new chairman of the Universal Motown Republic Group, while at the same time, assuming the CEO position at the Island Def Jam Music Group. Under Weiss' leadership, Motown Records became an imprint of the Island Def Jam Music Group shortly after the disbandment of the UMRG. Kanye West's imprint, GOOD Music, was given a 10-year distribution partnership with IDJMG. GOOD Music assumed marketing, while Def Jam took over the manufacturing and distribution of its releases. The first official album released under the new partnership was Big Sean's debut, Finally Famous. In May, Def Soul Records was folded into Island Def Jam as a part of rearrangement of the Island Def Jam Music Group's multi-genre strategy.

That August, a Jay-Z and Kanye West collaborative album, Watch the Throne, was released under Island Def Jam's distribution. Producing 436,000 copies in its first week, it produced the biggest first week sales of 2011 hip hop and also the highest for IDJ since Mariah Carey's 2005 album.

2013: Final outbreak 
In 2013, Fall Out Boy, Iggy Azalea and Neon Trees solidified more success at the unit. Respectively, Fall Out Boy's Save Rock and Roll accumulated 154,000 copies, debuting at number one on Billboard. For Iggy Azalea, her single, "Change Your Life", went gold despite debuting at number thirty-four on the Billboard Hot R&B/Hip-Hop Songs chart. Neon Trees' single, "Sleeping with a Friend", made the number seven position on the Adult Top 40 chart after receiving positive feedback.

The Island Def Jam Music Group's operations in the United Kingdom were also changed that year with Mercury UK being absorbed into the new Virgin EMI Records. With the absorption of Mercury UK also involved the end of Def Jam UK, with all of Island, Def Jam, Republic, Virgin and Motown's artists being distributed under the newly reiterated imprint in the region. It has occurred following UMG's acquisition of the recording music division of EMI a year earlier.

2014: Disbandment 
On April Fools Day 2014, Lucian Grainge, chairman and CEO of the Universal Music Group, confirmed the disbandment of the Island Def Jam Music Group. The unit ceased to exist after East Coast label faction CEO Barry Weiss' departure. Grainge explained: 

It was believed that Weiss was valiantly dissatisfied with the fact that he would be demoted to an underpromotion at Universal Music with Michele Anthony being promoted to executive vice president at the company's recorded music unit and John Janick replacing Jimmy Iovine as chairman and CEO of Island Def Jam's sister unit, Interscope Geffen A&M. He was also in talks with Grainge to create a new joint venture with UMG.

With Island Def Jam disbanded, operations had been traced solely into all three label units: Def Jam Recordings will now act as its own label under Universal Music, but remains a sister label to Island Records with new farther relations, while Motown Records currently operates under the Capitol Music Group. Mercury Records had folded into Island following the closure, but had since been reactivated in 2022 by Universal Music and later moved to Republic Records.

In terms of corporate leadership, Steve Bartels was reassigned to CEO of Def Jam, David Massey remained president and CEO of Island, and Ethiopia Habtemariam was named president of Motown. As of 2022, despite the shutdown, there is a Facebook and Instagram joint account called Island Def Jam France, taking the unit name and being maintained by Universal Music France to promote both labels' music altogether.

Awards and accolades
According to the 2012 radio airplay analysis of music industry service Mediabase, IDJMG became the number-one rhythmic label with seven number one songs played on rhythmic radio stations including songs from Rihanna, Kanye West, Jay-Z, Ne-Yo, and Justin Bieber.

Labels

Island Records 

 4th & B'way Records
 Casablanca Records 
 Monarc Entertainment
 Photo Finish Records 
 Tuff Gong

Def Jam Recordings 

 Disturbing tha Peace

Mercury Records 

 EmArcy Records
 Limelight Records 
 Total Experience Records

Motown Records 

 Motown Gospel

Other labels, divisions or affiliates 

 Artium Records

Former or defunct 
 American Recordings 
 Chemistry Records
 Def Con II
 Def Jamaica
 Def Jam Japan
 Def Jam UK
 Def Jam South
 Def Soul
 Def Soul Classics
 Capricorn Records 
 GOOD Music
 Intrepid Records
 Island Black Music
 Island Urban Music
 Lost Highway Records 
 Margaritaville Records
 Mercury Classics 
 Mercury International 
 Mercury Nashville 
 Murder Inc. Records
 Radio Killa Records
 Roadrunner Records 
 Roc-A-Fella Records
 Roc-La-Familia
 The Rocket Record Company
 Rush Associated Labels
 Russell Simmons Music Group
 Smash Records
 So So Def Recordings 
 Tag Records 
 Teen Island
 Vertigo Records 
 Wing Records

Notable artists before dissolvement
Avicii
Adrienne Bailon
Anthrax (American band)
Ashanti
August Alsina
Big Sean
Bob Marley
Bon Jovi
Cameo
Christina Milian
DMX
Dru Hill
Elton John
Fall Out Boy
Frank Ocean
Hanson
Iggy Azalea
Insane Clown Posse
Janet Jackson
Ja Rule
Jay-Z
Jeezy
Jennifer Lopez
Johnny Cash
Justin Bieber
Kanye West
The Killers
Kurtis Blow
Lionel Richie
LL Cool J
Logic
Ludacris
Mariah Carey
Method Man
The Mighty Mighty Bosstones
Ne-Yo
Neon Trees
Nickelback
Patti LaBelle
Redman
Rihanna
Saliva
Shania Twain
Sum 41

References

External links
 

American record labels
Companies based in New York City
Labels distributed by Universal Music Group
1998 establishments in the United States
Record labels disestablished in 2014
Island Records
Def Jam Recordings